Simon Lindley (born 10 October 1948) is an English organist, choirmaster, conductor and composer. He was Leeds City Organist from 1976 to 2017 (named City Organist Emeritus in Summer 2017) and is Organist Emeritus of Leeds Minster, having been organist and Master of the Music Leeds Minster from 1975 until his retirement in 2016.

Early life 
Lindley was born in London. His father was an Anglican priest, and his mother was a writer, the daughter of Belgian poet and art historian Emile Cammaerts. After early education at Magdalen College School, Oxford, and graduation from the Royal College of Music in London, Lindley began an organ career in 1969, playing at various London churches and recording organ music.

Career 
Lindley served as an organ tutor at the Royal School of Church Music and later as Assistant Master of Music at St Albans Cathedral to Peter Hurford and Director of Music at St Albans School. From 1975/6 he became Leeds City Organist and Organist & Master of the Music at Leeds Minster, and directed the Choir of Leeds Parish Church. From 1977, he has served a Music Director of Saint Peter's Singers of Leeds, a post he held until 2020. He was Senior Lecturer in Music at Leeds Polytechnic - now Leeds Beckett University from 1976 to 1987 and held the post of Senior Assistant Music Officer for Leeds City Council from 1987 to 2011. During the 1970s and 80s he was Chorus Master to Halifax Choral Society and Leeds Philharmonic Society. Since 1991 he has served as Secretary of the Church Music Society. From 2009 and 2010 respectively, Lindley has held posts as conductor of Sheffield Bach Society and Doncaster Choral Society. From 1997 until 2022 he served as Music Director of Overgate Hospice Choir Halifax.

Awards and Honorary Posts 
Lindley was president of the Royal College of Organists from 2000 to 2003, and of the Incorporated Association of Organists from 2003 to 2005. In 2001 he received an honorary doctorate from Leeds Metropolitan University now Leeds Beckett University and a similar distinction was conferred upon him in 2012 by the University of Huddersfield. He served on the editorial panel for New English Praise (2006), a supplement to the New English Hymnal, and he worked extensively on compilation of the supplement. He has been chairman of the Ecclesiastical Music Trust from 2004 and was Chairman of the Yorkshire College of Music and Drama from 2006 to 2013. He was in office as Grand Organist to the United Grand Lodge of England from 2010 to 2012 and has held office since 2010 in the Masonic Province of Yorkshire West Riding as Provincial Grand Organist. Lindley is the recipient of the "Spirit of Leeds"  award from Leeds Civic Trust presented in 2006 and The Leeds Award from Leeds City Council in 2016.

Recordings and Voluntary Work 
Lindley has recorded as organ soloist with orchestras including the BBC Philharmonic and Northern Sinfonia, with Huddersfield Choral Society, and as accompanist to such musicians as violinists David Greed and Marat Bisengaliev and cornet virtuoso Phillip McCann. He also holds office as conductor of choirs and choral societies in Doncaster, Halifax, Leeds and Sheffield and since retirement from full time work in 2016, has in recent times assisted with the music at Halifax Minster, St Michael and All Angels Church, Headingley and St Wilfrid's Church, Harrogate. From 2006 until 2019 he gave a monthly Organ Concert each month in Fulneck Moravian Church.

References

External links 
Official website
[ Simon Lindley at Allmusic.com]
Leeds International Concert Season
St Peter's Singers
Leeds Town Hall
Sheffield Bach Choir
Doncaster Choral Society
Overgate Hospice Choir
Church Music Society
One Equal Music

1948 births
English classical organists
British male organists
People from the London Borough of Bexley
English people of Belgian descent
English people of German descent
Alumni of Leeds Beckett University
Living people
Alumni of the Royal College of Music
21st-century organists
21st-century British male musicians
Musicians from Leeds
English choral conductors
Musicians from Sheffield
Male classical organists